The Cascade Kasperwing I-80 is an American ultralight flying wing motorglider that was designed by Witold Kasper and Steve Grossruck. It was produced by Cascade Ultralites and introduced in 1976. The aircraft was supplied as a kit for amateur construction.

Design and development
It features a cable--braced high-wing, a single-seat, open cockpit, tricycle landing gear and a single engine in pusher configuration.

The aircraft is made from bolted together aluminum tubing, with the wing Dacron sailcloth covered. Its  span, single-surface wing employs a special Kasper-designed airfoil that allows both normal flight and a fully controlled, completely stalled parachutal descent mode. The wing is cable-braced from a single kingpost. The pilot is accommodated in a nylon-web swing seat. The controls are unconventional, with pitch controlled by weight shift and roll and yaw controlled by canted-outwards wing tip rudders. The landing gear is of tricycle configuration, with a steerable nosewheel that has reversed controls; the pilot pushes the right pedal to go left and vice versa.

The I-80 can be fully disassembled for transport, including reducing the wing to a compact bag of tubing, while the fuselage cage remains assembled

Variants
I-80
Initial open cockpit model, without a windshield
I-80 BX
Enclosed cockpit version

Aircraft on display
US Southwest Soaring Museum

Specifications (180)

References

External links

Photos of the Kasperwing I-80

1970s United States ultralight aircraft
Homebuilt aircraft
Single-engined pusher aircraft